The World Database on Protected Areas (WDPA) is the largest assembly of data on the world's terrestrial and marine protected areas, containing more than 260,000 protected areas as of August 2020, with records covering 245 countries and territories throughout the world. The WDPA is a joint venture between the United Nations Environment Programme World Conservation Monitoring Centre (UNEP-WCMC) and the International Union for Conservation of Nature (IUCN) World Commission on Protected Areas (WCPA).

Data for the WDPA is collected from international convention secretariats, governments and collaborating NGOs, but the role of custodian is allocated to the Protected Areas Programme of UNEP-WCMC, based in Cambridge, UK, who have hosted the database since its creation in 1981. The WDPA delivers invaluable information to decision-makers around the world, particularly in terms of measuring the extent and effectiveness of protected areas as an indicator for meeting global biodiversity targets. In October 2010, UNEP-WCMC launched the social media-based website Protected Planet, which allows users to interact with and improve the data that is currently recorded on the World Database on Protected Areas.

Content
The WDPA uses the IUCN's definition of a protected area as the main criteria for entries to be included in the database.
The database contains comprehensive information on the different types of protected areas ranging from those strictly protected for conservation purposes to those where sustainable use of natural resources is allowed; and includes government, co-managed, private and community-managed areas. The IUCN's World Commission on Protected Areas gives international guidance on the categorisation of protected areas, through its Protected Area Management Categories. These categories are recognised worldwide and facilitate a global system for defining and recording protected areas. Within the WPDA the IUCN Management Category of a protected area is listed (if one has been assigned/reported) as part of the information on a protected area.

Data held in the WDPA is made up of both 'attribute' and 'spatial' information. Attribute data refers to the characteristics of a protected area, such as its name, reported area and designation type. Spatial data is provided in the form of Geographical Information System (GIS) electronic maps, often referred to as shapefiles. These files provide information on the location (latitude & longitude) and spatial extent of a protected area, either as a midpoint location or a polygon that shows the boundaries of a protected area, which gives the indication of its size and shape. This is the form that the data takes on Protected Planet through which the data on WDPA is available for public use worldwide. The WDPA Development Team at UNEP-WCMC has a formal agreement with the Global Biodiversity Information Facility (GBIF) to integrate their network species occurrence data with the shapefiles of protected areas on the WDPA, which assists governmental, non-governmental and private organisations to visualise the density of species within a protected area.

Protected areas within the WDPA are assigned as having a national or international designation. Many protected areas fall into the category of being nationally designated, where they are designated within a country's national territory (including their maritime Economic Exclusive Zone) using the appropriate legislation or agreements. Internationally designated sites are primarily those of significant environmental, cultural or natural value that should be protected irrespective of the territory on which they are located. These areas are often recognized, preserved and protected under an international treaty or convention. In some cases, an internationally recognized site may be nationally designated as well.

The most common international conventions under which protected areas are designated are:

United Nations Educational, Scientific and Cultural Organization (UNESCO) World Heritage Sites;
UNESCO seeks to encourage the identification, protection and preservation of cultural and natural heritage around the world considered to be of outstanding value to humanity. This is embodied in an international treaty called the Convention concerning the Protection of the World Cultural and Natural Heritage, adopted by UNESCO in 1972.

United Nations Educational, Scientific and Cultural Organization (UNESCO) Man and the Biosphere Programme (MAB)
The Man and the Biosphere Programme (MAB), proposes an interdisciplinary research agenda and capacity building aim to improve the relationship of people with their environment globally. Since its launch in 1970 MAB has concentrated on the development of the World Network of Biosphere Reserves (WNBR). The biosphere reserve concept was developed initially in 1974 and was substantially revised in 1995 with the adoption by the UNESCO General Conference of the Statutory Framework and the Seville Strategy for Biosphere Reserves.

The Convention on Wetlands of International Importance (Ramsar Convention)
The Convention on Wetlands is an intergovernmental treaty adopted on 2 February 1971 in the Iranian city of Ramsar, on the southern shore of the Caspian Sea. The Convention entered into force in 1975 and its mission, as adopted by the Parties in 1999 and refined in 2002, is “the conservation and wise use of all wetlands through local, regional and national actions and international cooperation, as a contribution towards achieving sustainable development throughout the world”.

Uses
As the only comprehensive global inventory of the world's protected areas, the WDPA is the key resource for managing and researching protected areas in order to conserve the world's living resources.
Through Protected Planet the information in the WDPA is openly available in numerous formats and is used not only within the biological science community, but also for individuals, government agencies, non-profit organisations and private sector businesses. The WDPA is used predominantly for the following purposes;

UNEP-WCMC
 To combine species data from the Global Biodiversity Information Facility (GBIF) with spatial analysis of the WDPA to monitor species occurrence within protected areas in order to establish key biodiversity areas and certain species' endangered status.
 To report progress on the Millennium Development Goals and the Biodiversity Target of the Convention on Biological Diversity),
 To conduct assessments such as the Global Biodiversity Outlook and Biodiversity Indicators Partnership (BIP) 2010 
 Estimation of the extent and quantity of carbon stocks protected by the UN Framework Convention on Climate Change (UNFCCC)

Governmental and Non-Governmental Organisations
 Support and tracking of world and regional progress towards a number of international targets, mandates, and assessments
 Support decision making when used in combination with earth observations to assess pressures on protected areas, such as in the Digital Observatory for Protected Areas DOPA) developed by the Joint Research Centre of the European Commission 
 Gap analysis of protected areas: many countries and regions are undertaking this work to identify the extent of protection for biomes, habitats, and species, which helps with prioritizing the establishment of protected areas
 Planning of new protected areas: the Integrated Biodiversity Assessment Tool IBAT, makes protected areas data from the WDPA available for research and conservation planning.

Private sector
 To comply with environmental safeguard policies of many governments, industry groups such as the International Council on Mining and Metals (ICMM), and major development and investment banks.
 To conduct Risk Assessment and Environmental Impact Assessments. Various industries use WDPA data to plan their activities away from important conservation areas so a balance between development and conservation is achieved, with a separate business IBAT available that allows business to access and analyse critical biodiversity information.

Other
 Amongst various other uses for the scientific community, the WDPA is used to research into the extent, location and effectiveness of protected areas.
 Used by National Geographic to detail the location of protected areas in the production of their maps.
 Integration of the marine protected areas layer from the WDPA into Google Earth

Protected Planet
Protected Planet has been developed as a database internet portal for WDPA with the intention of being more user-friendly and enabling users to visualise, explore and measure protected areas through interactive maps and summary statistics tools. The aim of such a development is to reduce the burden of data gathering and to make the collection of protected areas more efficient, whereas the WDPA was previously reliant on the assistance of numerous national agencies and hindered by incomplete information on protected area sites and the constant need for updates.

Protected Planet was launched at the Convention on Biological Diversity 10th Conference of the Parties in Nagoya Japan in October 2010 and was largely funded by investment from the private sector. It acts as a new-age infrastructure for the downloading of Protected Area data by registered users. It is hosted on multiple servers across the globe, and registered data providers can range from being a single individual to a large global organisation.

Web technology is being utilised to improve searching options and search results displayed, to generate better data downloads and to produce a standardized format through minimum fields requiring completion. The fact that Protected Planet is open to academics, and scientists, students, researchers, park managers and local communities, enables it to use online tools to generate up to date statistics on protected areas and employ feedback from users to make further improvements.

Using social networking tools, Protected Planet allows the WDPA to be displayed alongside additional resources such as photos, points of interest and nearby protected areas, with interoperability and discovery of information from Wikipedia, the Global Biodiversity Information Facility (GBIF) and Panoramio photo services.

See also
 List of largest protected areas
 UNEP-WCMC
 IUCN-WCPA
 Protected Area Categories

References

External links
 WDPA
 Protected Planet
 UNEP World Conservation Monitoring Centre
 IUCN World Commission on Protected Areas
 GBIF Collaboration with WDPA

1981 establishments in England
Databases in the United Kingdom
Organisations based in Cambridge
Organizations established in 1981
Protected areas
Science and technology in Cambridgeshire
Scientific databases